Robin Gerard Penleigh Boyd  (3 January 1919 – 16 October 1971) was an Australian architect, writer, teacher and social commentator.  He, along with Harry Seidler, stands as one of the foremost proponents for the International Modern Movement in Australian architecture. Boyd is the author of the influential book The Australian Ugliness (1960), a critique on Australian architecture, particularly the state of Australian suburbia and its lack of a uniform architectural goal.

Like his American contemporary John Lautner, Boyd had relatively few opportunities to design major buildings and his best known and most influential works as an architect are his numerous and innovative small house designs.

Background and early life

Robin Boyd was a scion of the Boyd artistic dynasty in Australia, and his extended family were involved painters, sculptors, architects, writers and others in the arts. Robin was the younger son of the painter Penleigh Boyd, and his own son, named after his grandfather Penleigh, is an architect. He was a nephew of author Martin Boyd and a first cousin of Australian painter Arthur Boyd and his brothers David and Guy. In 1938 his grandfather Arthur Merric Boyd offered him his first commission, a studio for Arthur Boyd on the Boyd property, Open Country, at Murrumbeena. A further cousin was Joan à Beckett Weigall, Lady Lindsay (author of Picnic at Hanging Rock). She married Sir Ernest Daryl Lindsay, director of the National Gallery of Victoria, brother to artists Norman Lindsay and Sir Lionel Lindsay.

Robin Boyd's Queensland-born mother, Edith, was herself a skilled painter who also came from a prominent family. Her father, John Gerard Anderson, had been Director of the Queensland Department of Public Instruction, her brother Arthur was a well-known physician, and her eldest sister Maud was of one of the first women to graduate with an Arts degree from the University of Sydney and is thought to have been Queensland's first female university graduate.

Robin Boyd and his older brother Pat spent their early childhood at 'The Robins', the family home and studio that his father had built on land he purchased at Warrandyte, near Melbourne but in 1922 Penleigh sold 'The Robins' and moved his family to Sydney. Soon after arriving, he was enlisted by Sydney Ure Smith as one of the organisers of a major exhibition of contemporary European art. Penleigh took his family with him to England late in the year to pick paintings; he returned to Sydney without them in June 1923 to set up the exhibition, which was staged in Sydney and Melbourne during July–August. During his wife's absence Penleigh had a brief affair with another woman but shortly before his family returned from England he bought back 'The Robins' and purchased a new car.

Edith, Pat and Robin returned to Australia on 23 November 1923, but Penleigh and Edith had a heated argument soon after the homecoming. A few days later, for reasons unknown, Penleigh left Melbourne to drive to Sydney in the company of another person, but he lost control of the vehicle on a sharp bend near Warragul and it overturned. The passenger survived but Penleigh suffered terrible injuries and died at the scene within minutes. The proceeds of Penleigh's estate—including the sale of 'The Robins', the repaired car and about 40 paintings, plus an annual allowance from Penleigh's father, and a small inheritance from her own father—enabled Edith Boyd to support her sons without needing to work, even during the depths of the Depression.

After Penleigh's death Edith and the boys lived for a time in rented premises in upperclass Toorak and Robin's first two years of schooling were at Glamorgan Preparatory School. Edith bought a modest house in East Malvern in 1927, when Robin was enrolled at the nearby Lloyd Street State School. As a schoolboy he read widely and became an avid fan of films and jazz music. In 1930 he moved on to the Malvern Church of England Grammar School, where he completed his schooling. He sat for his Leaving Certificate in 1934 and although he failed one subject (Commercial Principles) at the first attempt, he passed that the following year. He had evidently decided quite early on architecture as his chosen career so his mother arranged for him to be articled to leading Melbourne architect Kingsley Henderson. He served in Papua-New Guinea during World War II and resumed his architectural career in 1945.

Architectural career

Boyd first came to notice in the late 1940s for his promotion of inexpensive, functional, partially prefabricated homes incorporating modernist aesthetics. Most of his architectural output was residential, although he also designed some larger buildings including the Domain Park residential tower block and the John Batman Motor Inn in Melbourne and the Australian headquarters of the Winston Churchill Memorial Trust in Canberra, on which he was working at the time of his death.

Boyd was the first Director of the Royal Victorian Institute of Architects Small Homes Service from 1947 to 1953 and for many years from 1948 he was the editor of this service for The Age newspaper, for which he also wrote weekly articles. The Small Homes Service provided designs of inexpensive houses, which attempted to incorporate modern architectural aesthetics and functional planning and were sold to the public for a small fee, and through this work Boyd became a household name in Victoria.

In 1948 Boyd was the recipient of the RVIA Robert and Ada Haddon Travelling Scholarship. The scholarship gave Boyd his first opportunity to travel through Europe which would have a profound influence on his later work.

In 1953 he formed a partnership with Frederick Romberg (1910–1992) and Roy Grounds (1905–1981); their influential Melbourne firm became a significant force in Australian architecture and through the 1950s and 1960s Boyd developed a number of important houses in the regional style, including a 1952 Canberra house for Australian historian Manning Clark.

Boyd was a prolific architect, with over 200 designs to his credit in his relatively short career. He was the sole designer of most of these projects although a number of early commissions were jointly designed with his unofficial partners Kevin Pethebridge and Frank Bell (1945–47) and others were jointly designed with his partners Grounds and Romberg (1953–62). After the acrimonious departure of Grounds from the practice in 1962, Romberg continued in partnership with Boyd until the latter's death.

Boyd was equally prolific and influential as a writer, commentator, educator and public speaker, vehemently supporting modernism in his The Australian Ugliness (1960) with a condemnation of visual pollution and vulgar 'featurism'. His work was documented and promoted by photographers Mark Strizic and Wolfgang Sievers, then the most prominent in their field. For many years from 1947 he was director of The Age Small Homes Service and influenced many people with his popular weekly articles on the subject. He was also lecturer in architecture at the University of Melbourne, and in 1956-57 he took up a teaching position at the Massachusetts Institute of Technology in Boston offered by Walter Gropius, a friend of Boyd's and a Director at MIT.

In 1958 Boyd wrote the liner notes for satirist Barry Humphries' first commercial recording, a 7 inch EP Wild Life in Suburbia (1958).

Boyd wrote nine books. His groundbreaking Australia's Home (1952) was the first substantial historical survey of Australian domestic architecture, and his best-known and most influential work, The Australian Ugliness (1960) was a popular and outspoken criticism of prevailing establishment tastes in architecture and in popular culture. Boyd was a dogged critic of the decorative tendency that he dubbed "Featurism", which he described as:

In 1967 Boyd presented the Boyer Lectures, which were broadcast nationally on ABC Radio. He delivered five lectures on a variety of topics and issues relating to Australia, architecture and design and prevailing cultural values of the time, under the series title Artificial Australia.

He was awarded the Royal Australian Institute of Architects Gold Medal in 1969.

Death and legacy
Boyd travelled overseas in April–May 1971, when he contracted an infection and on his return to Australia his doctor detected a heart murmur. In early July his condition worsened and he was admitted to St Andrew's Hospital (now the Peter MacCallum Cancer Centre) in Melbourne; he was diagnosed with interstitial pneumonia, told that the infection had settled in one of his heart valves and administered massive six-hourly doses of ampicillin. He recovered somewhat and struggled on through August–September, maintaining his usual heavy work schedule, but in early October his condition deteriorated again and he was admitted to the Royal Melbourne Hospital. Doctors puzzled over a diagnosis but eventually decided to extract all his teeth under full anaesthetic, believing the infection had settled there. He suffered a stroke while recovering from the operation, and although he briefly rallied enough to recognise his wife Patricia, he died three days later on 16 October 1971, aged 52.

In 2005, the not-for-profit Robin Boyd Foundation was established by a group including Boyd's family, the Australian Institute of Architects (Victoria Chapter), the faculties of architecture at the University of Melbourne, Deakin University and RMIT University, and others with expertise, interest and commitment to the advancement of design. Their website lists the Foundation's aims, which are to deepen understanding of the benefits of design through design awareness, design literacy and design advocacy. The Hon. Gough Whitlam was the founding patron of the foundation. From 17 August to 2 October 2011, the Mornington Peninsula Regional Gallery displayed all of the houses that Boyd had created for the Mornington Peninsula region.

2019 marked the centenary of Boyd, and "the thirty-year anniversary of a two-day event comprising a public symposium, exhibition, publications and building tour dedicated to Robin Boyd." A special issue of the RMIT Design Archives Journal was produced to mark these two anniversaries entitled: Robin Boyd Redux.

Major completed projects

See also

Robin Boyd Award
Boyd family

References

Further reading

 Discussion: Robin Boyd: Spatial Continuity by Mauro Baracco and Louise Wright, published by Routledge. . . Review, Janina Gosseye, ARCHICTUREAU, 2 Nov 2017.

External links

 Australian Dictionary of Biography
 Robin Boyd Foundation
 Modern In Melbourne 2: Practice Profiles - Robin Boyd (Ursula Navarro & Chris Reddaway, researchers) 
 Flickr.com - The Architecture of Robin Boyd - (Flickr photo group)
 Boyd Homes Group blog site
 "Post War Australia - Boyd's Featurism"
 Frederick Romberg and Robin Boyd Collection RMIT Design Archives - via Research Data Australia.

1919 births
1971 deaths
Modernist architects
Modernist architecture in Australia
Australian people of Scottish descent
Recipients of the Royal Australian Institute of Architects’ Gold Medal
20th-century Australian architects
Robin
Architects from Melbourne
Australian people of English descent